Succinylsulfathiazole (also known as sulfasuxidine) is a sulfonamide. It is also spelled as succinylsulphathiazole. It is a white or yellow-white crystalline powder. It dissolves in aqueous solutions of alkali hydroxides and carbonates but is very slightly soluble in water.

It is classified as ultra long-acting drug. About 95% of the drug remains in the intestine and only 5% is hydrolyzed, slowly, to sulfathiazole and is absorbed.

The drug is used for its antibacterial activity in the GIT. The dose is 10g - 20g daily in divided doses.

The Succinyl group is attached to form a prodrug for the controlled release of the drug sulfathiazole.

References 

2-Thiazolyl compounds
Sulfonamide antibiotics
Anilides